Picayune Memorial High School is a grade 9–12 high school located in Picayune, Mississippi, United States.

State Championships

Football
1925
1943
1948
1986
2011
2013
2021
2022

Baseball
2002

Golf
1992
2021

Notable people

Staff
Butch van Breda Kolff, former college and NBA coach was head basketball coach from 1983 to 1984.
Jimmy Johnson, former college and NFL head football coach was an assistant coach in 1966.

Alumni
Jonathan Bender, basketball player of the Indiana Pacers and New York Knicks
Rhyne Hughes, baseball player of the Baltimore Orioles
T. J. House, baseball player of the Cleveland Indians and Toronto Blue Jays
Jerone Davison, football player of the Oakland Raiders

References

External links
 

1925 establishments in Mississippi
Educational institutions established in 1925
Public high schools in Mississippi
Schools in Pearl River County, Mississippi